The large moth family Gelechiidae contains the following genera:

Pachygeneia
Palintropa
Paltoloma
Palumbina
Pancoenia
Panicotricha
Parabola
Parachronistis
Paralida
Parallactis
Paranarsia
Parapodia
Parapsectris
Paraschema
Paraselotis
Parastega
Parastenolechia
Parathectis
Pauroneura
Pavolechia
Pectinophora
Pelocnistis
Pelostola
Perioristica
Pessograptis
Petalostomella
Peucoteles
Pexicopia
Phaeotypa
Phanerophalla
Pharangitis
Phloeocecis
Phloeograptis
Phobetica
Photodotis
Phricogenes
Phrixocrita
Phthoracma
Phthorimaea
Phylopatris
Physoptila
Pilocrates
Piskunovia
Pithanurga
Pityocona
Platyedra
Platymacha
Platyphalla
Plocamosaris
Pogochaetia
Polyhymno
Porpodryas
Pragmatodes
Primischema
Proadamas
Procharista
Proclesis
Prodosiarcha
Prolita
Promolopica
Proselotis
Prosodarma
Prostomeus
Proteodoxa
Protolechia
Protoparachronistis
Psamathocrita
Pseudarla
Pseudathrips
Pseudochelaria
Pseudosophronia
Pseudosymmoca
Pseudoteleia
Pseudotelphusa
Psoricoptera
Ptilostonychia
Ptocheuusa
Ptycerata
Ptychovalva
Pycnobathra
Pycnodytis
Pyncostola

References

 Natural History Museum Lepidoptera genus database

Gelechiidae
Gelechiid